The National Cycle Route 544 is a Sustrans regional route in the North Wessex Downs of southern Oxfordshire, linking Wantage and Didcot.

Route

The starts in the east of Didcot and passes between East and West Hagbourne as a traffic-free bridle-way and track, partly using a disused railway embankment. The path continues through Upton, merging with the Icknield Way as it continues west, behind Harwell and East Hendred, through the Harwell Science and Innovation Campus. The route then follows a quiet country lane through the Lockinge Estate, including East and West Ginge, and East and West Lockinge. The route finishes in Wantage near Letcombe Brook.

The route is frequently used by commuters between Wantage, Didcot and the Harwell research centre. There is an art trail between Didcot and Upton.

References

External links
Sustrans.org.uk Route 544
Vale of the White Horse District Council: Cycling in the Vale
Southern Oxfordshire cycling
Harbug.org.uk Didcot to Wantage cycle map PDF 
GPS Cycle and Walking Routes: Didcot to Wantage